Willie Colon (born April 9, 1983) is a former American football player. He was drafted by the Pittsburgh Steelers in the fourth round of the 2006 NFL Draft. He was part of the Steelers' Super Bowl XLIII victory over the Arizona Cardinals. He played college football at Hofstra University. He currently co-hosts Morning Men with Evan Cohen and Mike Babchik on Mad Dog Sports Radio.

High school/college career
Colon attended Cardinal Hayes High School in The Bronx. As a senior, he received the Cardinal Hayes Outstanding Defensive Player Award as the defensive MVP. He chose to attend Hofstra, majoring in interdisciplinary studies. Colon is of Puerto Rican descent.

Professional career

Pittsburgh Steelers
Colon was selected by the Pittsburgh Steelers in the fourth round (131st overall) of the 2006 NFL Draft. He started the first two games of his career in Weeks 16 and 17 of the 2006 season, replacing an injured Max Starks. This sparked a position battle with Starks for starting right tackle, which continued through an unspectacular 2007 season. Colon was a member of the Steelers' Super Bowl XLIII championship team. He re-signed with the Steelers after the 2008 season for a one-year deal worth $2.2 million.

While working out during the offseason in June 2010, Colon tore his Achilles tendon, forcing him to miss the entire 2010 NFL season.

On July 29, 2011, Colon signed a five-year deal worth $29 million with the Steelers. In week 1 against the Baltimore Ravens, Colon tore his triceps and missed the rest of the season.

Colon was released from the Steelers on March 13, 2013.

New York Jets
The New York Jets signed Colon to a one–year contract on March 15, 2013. The New York Jets re-signed Colon to a one-year contract worth $2 million on March 19, 2014.

Barstool Sports
After his playing career, Colon joined Barstool Sports as a radio host for the Barstool Breakfast show on SiriusXM Barstool Radio on channel 85.

Morning Men
Colon joined the Morning Men Radio Show on SiriusXM Mad Dog Sports Radio on channel 82, becoming the 3rd host alongside Evan Cohen and Mike Babchik.

References

External links
 Hofstra bio
 New York Jets bio
 Pittsburgh Steelers Bio

1983 births
Living people
American football offensive guards
American football offensive tackles
American sportspeople of Puerto Rican descent
Barstool Sports people
Hofstra Pride football players
New York Jets players
Pittsburgh Steelers players
Sportspeople from the Bronx
Players of American football from New York City
Cardinal Hayes High School alumni
American sports radio personalities
Ed Block Courage Award recipients